Harun Rashid Khan, was a Deputy Governor of Reserve Bank of India between 2011 and 2016.

Early life and education
Khan had his early schooling at Badagada Highschool in Bhubaneswar. He was a brilliant student. Although he studied in the vernacular medium, he regularly won first prizes at State level debate and elocution contests in English, and was a multiple winner of the Governor's Cup for elocution.

Khan obtained his Master's degree in Political Science from Utkal University. Later he obtained Master of Philosophy degree from the School of International Studies of Jawaharlal Nehru University.

Career in RBI
Khan joined Reserve Bank of India in 1978. Between 2007 and 2008, Khan was the Director of Bank of Maharashtra and Punjab and Sind Bank. He has also been an Executive Director of RBI and Director of NABARD and later became the Principal of RBI's College of Agricultural Banking (CAB) at Pune, before getting appointed as the Regional Director of RBI, New Delhi. . He was appointed as Deputy Governor in July 2011 where he worked on internal debt management, external investment and exchange control.

Outstanding achievement
Khan was the Chairman of the RBI Internal Group on Rural Credit and Microfinance, which is popularly known as the Khan Committee. Based on the recommendations of the Khan Committee, RBI prepared guidelines for expansion of the banking outreach through the Business Facilitator and Business Correspondent models with ICT support, which revolutionized the spread of financial inclusion in India.

Towards the end of his career, Khan chaired the "Working Group on Development of Corporate Bond Market in India". Its report, also popularly referred to as "Khan Committee Report" considered various structural issues impinging on the development of a deep corporate bond market in India.

Personal life
Khan is married to Rosy and has a daughter named Sara. Khan is a strict vegetarian, while all other members in his family are non-vegetarian. This habit has won him the epithet of Vegetarian Khan.

Important assignments
 Chairman, RBI Internal Group on Rural Credit & Micro-finance
 Member Secretary, Committee on Ways and Means Advances for State Governments
 Convenor, Working Group on Instruments of Sterilisation
 Convenor, Working Group on Model Fiscal Responsibility & Budget Management Bill for States
 Member, G-20 Working Group on "Reinforcing International Cooperation & Market Integrity"
 Member, BIS Committee on "Global Financial System"
 Member, International Task Force on Central Counterparties

Speeches & Writings
IT Governance and IT Strategy: Boards' Eye View 
Financing Strategies for Urban Infrastructure: Trends and Challenges (RBI Bulletin, August 2013) 
Challenges and concerns of the central bank - opportunities and role for the commercial banks ( BIS - Publications)
 Promoting Retail Investor Participation in Government Bonds (8th Annual National Conference on Capital Markets on the theme "Confidence Building Measures for Retail Investors" on 9 January 2013 at Mumbai)
 Understanding Psychology through Responsible Financial Behaviour (Maharishi Dayanand College, Mumbai on 6 February 2012)
 The Shrinking Money & RBI's Economic Policy (National Management Seminar, Bhubaneswar on 10 December 2011)

References

1955 births
Living people
Indian bankers
People from Odisha
Reserve Bank of India
Indian Muslims